National Shop Stewards Network (NSSN) is a network of shop stewards launched in Britain in 2007.

Foundation
The NSSN was founded at a conference called by the National Union of Rail, Maritime and Transport Workers (RMT) on 7 July 2007. The proposal to re-establish a shop stewards movement came from an RMT sponsored conference to discuss working class political representation held in January 2006.

Campaigns

Anti-cuts campaign
Following a unanimous decision of the steering committee, on 22 January 2011, the NSSN held a conference to discuss launching its own anti-cuts campaign. A motion from a majority on the steering committee proposed establishing an anti-cuts campaign "anti-cuts campaign, bringing trade unions and communities together to save all jobs and services", whilst a minority on the steering committee argued against the motion, opposing setting up an anti-cuts campaign and argued for "working with Coalition of Resistance, Right to Work and other groups, to build and launch a single national anti-cuts organisation early in 2011". In the debate both sides had equal speakers and shared responsibility for chairing the debate which lasted 2 1/2 hours, with the conference voting 305 to 89 to establish an anti-cuts campaign committee which was elected immediately afterwards.

Since the conference, the anti-cuts campaign has called on its supporters to lobby local councils against carrying out government imposed cuts and organised a lobby Labour's Local Government conference in London on 5 March 2011.

The NSSN has also been involved in supporting co-ordinated action between trade unions over proposed government changes to public sector pensions and has called a lobby of the TUC in London on 11 September 2011

Car industry
The NSSN has been involved in helping car workers organise campaigns against closures of car and component plants in Southampton and organised a meeting of car worker shop stewards to build further links. It has also been involved in defending union reps from victimisation at Swansea Linamar and Swindon Honda.

References

External links
 

labour movement in the United Kingdom
organizations established in 2007